Clearwater River Airport  is located near Clearwater River, Alberta, Canada.

References

External links
Page about this airport on COPA's Places to Fly airport directory

Registered aerodromes in Alberta
Clearwater County, Alberta